What's Missing is a rock band from Morgantown, West Virginia, formed in 2013. To date they have released two EPs: Under (2015), and Shortly Thereafter (2017). They have been described as "grungy, raspy pop-punk.” The band draws influence from artists like Green Day, Balance And Composure, and Rozwell Kid.

The band was formed by singer/guitarist Zane Miller, guitarist Aaron New, and drummer Matt Herrald after Miller and New began attending school together at West Virginia University, in the fall of 2013. New departed from the band in late 2018, and the band underwent changes before settling on the current line-up, featuring bassist Brian Spragg and guitarist Geoff Minnear. 

In the fall of 2015, the band released their first EP, Under, with help from producer Eric Kirkland. In the summer of 2016, they released a single, "Threadbare," with proceeds at the time going to victims of the Pulse night club shooting in Orlando. In February 2017, the band released their EP Shortly Thereafter with help from Spragg (who previously produced for Rozwell Kid) and was mixed by Mat Kerekes of Citizen.

Band members 
 Zane Miller - vocals, guitar
 Geoff Minnear - guitar
 Matt Herrald - drums
 Brian Spragg - bass

Discography 
EPs
 Under (2015)
 Shortly Thereafter (2017)
Singles
 "Threadbare" (2016)
 "Unfun - The Swelter Song" (2018)
 "Root" (2019)
 “Some Truth” (2019)
 “Bottle & Burst/Waste Me” (2020)
 “Cholula Oblongata” (2022)
 "Lion v. Tuna/Well" (2022)

References

External links 
 What's Missing - Facebook
 Twitter
 Instagram
 YouTube

Rock music groups from West Virginia
Musical groups established in 2013
2013 establishments in West Virginia